Senator Geddes may refer to:

George Geddes (engineer) (1809–1883), New York State Senate
John Geddes (politician) (1777–1828), South Carolina State Senate
Robert L. Geddes (born 1955), Idaho State Senate

See also
William Geddis (1896–1971), Northern Irish Senate